Ham Kee-yong (14 November 1930 – 9 November 2022) was a South Korean marathoner, best known as the winner of the 1950 Boston Marathon.

On 19 April 1950, he won the Boston Marathon with a record time of 2:32:39, under coach Sohn Kee-chung, the marathon winner at the 1936 Berlin Olympics. The second and third-place finishers that year, Song Gil-yun (송길윤, 宋吉允; 숭문중학) and Choe Yun-chil (최윤칠, 崔崙七; 연희대학) were also South Koreans. A South Korean male would not win the Boston Marathon again until 2001.

The Korean War broke out on 25 June 1950, so a planned victory celebration did not take place that year. On 18 April 2004, his feat was finally celebrated in his hometown, Chuncheon, with Ham in attendance.

Achievements

See also 
 Suh Yun-bok, the winner of the 1947 Boston marathon
 Lee Bong-ju, the winner of the 2001 Boston marathon

External links 
Ham Kee-yong 
congratulatory 2004 event
History of Korea's marathon

References

1930 births
2022 deaths
South Korean male marathon runners
South Korean businesspeople
Korea University alumni
Boston Marathon male winners
People from Chuncheon
20th-century South Korean people